"Chicken shit", or more commonly "chickenshit", is a slang term, usually regarded as vulgar. The online Merriam-Webster dictionary defines chickenshit (one word) as a vulgar adjective with two possible meanings: "petty, insignificant" or "lacking courage, manliness, or effectiveness".

Coward
The term has been used figuratively since 1929 to allege cowardice. It can be used as either a noun or an adjective; it is always an insult. In October 2014, an unnamed senior official in the Obama administration was reported to have called Israeli prime minister Benjamin Netanyahu a "chickenshit", adding that he "has got no guts". Secretary of State John Kerry apologized to the prime minister, while Israeli media scrambled to understand or translate the idiom.

Petty
The alternate meaning of "petty, insignificant nonsense" may be used as either a noun or an adjective. According to Paul Fussell in his book Wartime, chickenshit in this sense has military roots: "Chickenshit refers to behavior that makes military life worse than it need be: petty harassment of the weak by the strong; open scrimmage for power and authority and prestige; sadism thinly disguised as necessary discipline; a constant 'paying off of old scores'; and insistence on the letter rather than the spirit of the ordinances ... Chickenshit is so called—instead of horse—or bull—or elephant shit—because it is small-minded and ignoble and takes the trivial seriously."

Other uses
The phrase "You can't make chicken salad out of chicken shit" is sometimes used as a variant of "you can't make a silk purse out of a sow's ear". The expression dates back to at least the 1920s, when "chicken feathers" was sometimes used as a euphemism for chicken shit.

U.S. President Lyndon B. Johnson once said, "I may not know much, but I do know the difference between chicken shit and chicken salad."

See also

Bullshit
On Bullshit
Chicken manure
Shit
Shit happens

References

Slang
English profanity